Rhinophis drummondhayi, commonly known as Drummond-Hay's earth snake, is a species of snake in the family Uropeltidae. The species is endemic to Sri Lanka.

Habitat

Reproduction
R. drummondhayi is ovoviviparous.

Etymology
The specific name, drummondhayi, is in honor of Henry Maurice Drummond-Hay (1869–1932), who was a planter and naturalist in Ceylon (now Sri Lanka), and who was the son of Scottish ornithologist Colonel Henry Maurice Drummond-Hay (1814–1896).

References

Further reading
Smith MA (1943). The Fauna of British India, Ceylon and Burma, Including the Whole of the Indo-Chinese Sub-region. Reptilia and Amphibia. Vol. III.—Serpentes. London: Secretary of State for India. (Taylor and Francis, printers). xii + 583 pp. (Rhinophis drummondhayi, p. 89).
Wall F (1921). Ophidia Taprobanica or the Snakes of Ceylon. Colombo, Ceylon [Sri Lanka]: Colombo Museum. (H.R. Cottle, Government Printer). xxii + 581 pp. (Rhinophis drummondhayi, new species, pp. 43–44).

drummondhayi
Snakes of Asia
Endemic fauna of Sri Lanka
Reptiles of Sri Lanka
Reptiles described in 1921
Taxa named by Frank Wall